Moloja (also, Molozh’ya and Molozha) is a village in the Lankaran Rayon of Azerbaijan.  The village forms part of the municipality of Osakücə.

References 

Populated places in Lankaran District